Joseph Bouvier des Éclaz (December 3, 1757 – January 12, 1820) was a general of the First French Empire during the French Revolutionary Wars and Napoleonic Wars. He fought at the Battle of Fleurus in 1794, the Battle of Hohenlinden, the Battle of Austerlitz, the Peninsular War and the French invasion of Russia. He was made a general de brigade (brigadier general) in 1810. He was made a baron, commander of the Légion d'honneur and knight of the Order of Saint Louis.

Coat of arms

1757 births
1820 deaths
Generals of the First French Empire
Barons of the First French Empire
Commandeurs of the Légion d'honneur
Knights of the Order of Saint Louis
Names inscribed under the Arc de Triomphe